Maipokhari is a town and Village Development Committee  in Ilam District in the Province No. 1 of eastern Nepal. At the time of the 1991 Nepal census it had a population of 4,348 persons living in 931 individual households.

References

External links
UN map of the municipalities of Ilam District

Populated places in Ilam District